Herald Island may refer to:
Herald Island (Arctic), in Russia
Herald Island (New Zealand), in New Zealand
Herald Island (Queensland), Australia